The Taliabu leaf warbler (Phylloscopus emilsalimi) is a species of Old World warbler in the family Phylloscopidae. It was first described in 2020  and was named after Prof Emil Salim, a former Minister of Environment of the Republic of Indonesia and eminent environmentalist. It is found in the undisturbed montane forest on Taliabu Island in Indonesia from 700m up to probably the highest elevations above 1,400m. The species may also occur on the large neighboring Mangole Island.

References

Taliabu leaf warbler
Taliabu leaf warbler
Endemic fauna of Indonesia
Birds of the Maluku Islands